The Independence Centenary International Exposition was a World Expo held in Rio de Janeiro from September 7, 1922 to March 23, 1923, to celebrate the 100th anniversary of Brazil's Independence. The expo happened during the Epitácio Pessoa Administration and was regarded as an opportunity to show off Brazil's growing industries and commercial opportunities. The Expo's pavilions were constructed alongside the Rio Branco Avenue and built just for the occasion.

A total of 14 countries from 3 continents took part in this edition of the Expo.

Over 3,000,000 people attended the event.

Pavilions

National
Argentina, Belgium, Czechoslovakia, Denmark, France, England, Italy, Japan, Mexico, Norway, Portugal, Sweden and United States.

Exposition Pavilions
Administration Pavilion;
Food Pavilion;
Statistics Pavilion;
Festivity Pavilion;
Agriculture and Roads Pavilion;
Small Industries Pavilion;
Large Industries Pavilion;
Hunting and Fishing Pavilion;
Antarctica Brewery Pavilion;
Jewelry Pavilion;
Portugal's Honor Pavilion.

States Pavilions
The Brazilian States Pavilion was the biggest pavilion in the fair with 6,013 exhibitors from all Brazilian states.

References

First Brazilian Republic
1922 in Brazil
1923 in Brazil
20th century in Rio de Janeiro
Brazil